Dolní Zálezly is a municipality and village in Ústí nad Labem District in the Ústí nad Labem Region of the Czech Republic. It has about 600 inhabitants.

Geography
It lies in České středohoří on the left bank of the Elbe river.

History
The first written mention of Dolní Zálezly is from 1057.

References

Villages in Ústí nad Labem District